{{DISPLAYTITLE:C16H30O2}} 
The molecular formula C16H30O2 (molar mass: 254.40 g/mol, exact mass: 254.2246 u) may refer to: 

 Palmitoleic acid
 Sapienic acid

Molecular formulas